The 1983 CONCACAF Champions' Cup was the 19th edition of the annual international club football competition held in the CONCACAF region (North America, Central America and the Caribbean), the CONCACAF Champions' Cup. It determined that year's club champion of association football in the CONCACAF region and was played from 2 March 1983 till 1 February 1984.

The teams were split in two zones, North/Central American and Caribbean, (as North and Central American sections combined to qualify one team for the final), each one qualifying the winner to the final tournament. All the matches in the tournament were played under the home/away match system.

Mexican club Atlante beat Surinamese Robinhood 6–1 on aggregate, becoming CONCACAF champion for the first time in their history.

North/Central American Zone

First round

Second round

Independiente withdrew after series.
Atlante and Suchitepéquez advance to the third round.

Third round

Atlante advances to the CONCACAF Final.

Caribbean Zone

First round

SUBT advances to the third round.
Robinhood and Dakota advance to the second round.

Second round

Robinhood advances to the third round.

Third round

Robinhood advances to the CONCACAF Final.

Final

First leg

Second leg 

 Atlante won 3–1 on points (6–1 on aggregate).

Champion

References

1
CONCACAF Champions' Cup